The Military Decoration is a military award of the  Kingdom of Belgium.  It was established on December 23, 1873 and is awarded to non-commissioned officers and other ranks of the Belgian Armed Forces for long service.
Initially, the medal was created in 2 versions. The version for exceptional service, gallantry or devotion to duty was created by the same royal decree, has the same jewel, but a different ribbon. Currently, both medals still exist, but are considered to be separate awards, not variations of the same award.

Award Criteria 
Only non commissioned officers and enlisted personnel are eligible for the award.
The second class is awarded to non commissioned officers or enlisted personnel after 10 years of service.
5 years after the award of the second class, one is awarded the first class.  
Officers are not eligible for the award, but also receive a decoration for long service: the Military Cross.
When an individual is awarded both the military decoration and the military cross, only the latter can be worn on the uniform.

Award description 
The medal is a gilt cross pattée surmounted by the royal crown of Belgium with four rays between the cross arms.  The obverse bears a circular central medallion with a lion and the circular relief inscription "L'UNION FAIT LA FORCE" (STRENGTH IN UNITY).  The reverse is identical except for the central medallion, the center bears the royal monogram of the reigning monarch at time of award surrounded by the relief inscription  "ARMÉE * MÉRITE * ANCIENNETÉ" ("ARMY * MERIT * SENIORITY").
The medal is suspended by a ring through the suspension loop to a silk moiré ribbon of seventeen alternating longitudinal stripes of red, yellow and black.

Devices 
A gilt inverted metal chevron is affixed to the ribbon of the award first class.

See also
 List of Orders, Decorations and Medals of the Kingdom of Belgium

References 
 Clarke JD,Gallantry Medals & Awards of the World
 Royal Decree of 23 December 1873 creating the Military Decoration
 Belgian military regulation DGHR-REG-DISPSYS-001 of 20 February 2006
 Quinot H., 1950, Recueil illustré des décorations belges et congolaises, 4e Edition. (Hasselt)
 Cornet R., 1982, Recueil des dispositions légales et réglementaires régissant les ordres nationaux belges. 2e Ed. N.pl.,  (Brussels)
 Borné A.C., 1985, Distinctions honorifiques de la Belgique, 1830-1985 (Brussels)
 Report of written questions and answers in the Belgian House of Representatives, 17 March 2014 (QRVA 53-152)

External links
 Belgian Military Decoration at Northeastmedals

Military awards and decorations of Belgium
Awards established in 1873